Wessam Abou Ali (born 1 January 1999) is a Danish professional footballer who plays as a forward for Danish 1st Division club Vendsyssel FF.

Club career

AaB 
Starting out in local Aalborg club, B52/AFC, at age four, Abou Ali moved to the largest club in the region, AaB, six years later.

He made his senior Danish Superliga debut on 15 March 2018 against AC Horsens. He scored his first senior goal on 22 April 2018 against FC Midtjylland.

On 23 August 2019, Abou Ali was loaned out to Danish 1st Division club Vendsyssel FF for the rest of 2019. On 5 January 2020 it was confirmed, that he would continue at Vendsyssel for the rest of the season.

Silkeborg
On 9 September 2020, Abou Ali joined newly relegated Danish 1st Division club Silkeborg IF on a four-and-a-half-year contract until the end of 2024.

Return to Vendsyssel
In the search for more playing time, Abou Ali returned to Vendsyssel FF on 1 September 2021, signing a deal until June 2025. During his debut against Lyngby Boldklub on 12 September, Abou Ali suddenly collapsed on the pitch and was brought to the hospital. Abou Ali came on from the bench in the half time, before collapsing in the 59th minute. Two days later, he was discharged from the hospital and began rehabilitation.

On 15 February 2022 in a friendly game against Dynamo Moscow, Abou Ali had to be taken from the field on a stretcher and driven to the hospital after suffering a punctured lung.

International career
Born in Denmark, Abou Ali is of Palestinian descent. He is a youth international for Denmark.

References

External links
 
 

1999 births
Living people
Sportspeople from Aalborg
Danish people of Palestinian descent
Danish men's footballers
Association football forwards
AaB Fodbold players
Vendsyssel FF players
Silkeborg IF players
Danish Superliga players
Danish 1st Division players
Denmark youth international footballers